Dalmatian Action (Dalmatinska akcija or DA) is a regionalist and autonomist party in the region of Dalmatia within Croatia, that advocates for the political autonomy of Dalmatia within Croatia.

History 
It was founded in December 2021, by former members of Social Democratic Party of Croatia after disagreements with other members in local organization in Split, Croatia.

The party was founded by Tomislav Matijašević and Nino Aviani, and Teo Krnić was appointed secretary. In the last intra-party elections, Aviani ran for president of the Split SDP, but was excluded from the election process because he did not submit a declaration of non-punishment, so his candidacy was declared invalid due to incomplete documentation. For some time, the media discussed the fights between Aviani and Split SDP members because of the way the party was run. He also accused them that, under pressure, the appeal against the decision on exclusion from the electoral process failed only on the second attempt. He announced that he would request administrative supervision of the party's work due to a deliberate failure to conduct the election process.

The party took its name from the deleted Dalmatian Action from the 1990s, known for its conflict with the HDZ and then Croatian President Franjo Tuđman. That party was dissolved in 2003 by the decision of the Ministry of Justice.

See also 
 Autonomism
 Autonomist Party (Dalmatia)
 Dalmatia
 Dalmatian Action (1990)
 Dalmatian National Party (1990)
 Dalmatianism
 Regionalism

References

External links 
 Home page

Political parties established in 1990